Karen Kwan (born February 12, 1964) is an American politician serving in the Utah State Senate from the 12th district. On January 16, 2023 she was selected by delegates of the Utah Democratic Party to replace resigning Senator Karen Mayne.  Before her appointment to the Senate she served in the Utah House of Representatives, representing the 34th district from 2017 to 2023 (and briefly the 31st). She also previously served as the House Minority Whip.

Education 
Kwan has a bachelor's degree in psychology from Pepperdine University, an Ed.D. in educational leadership/policy from the University of Utah, and a master's degree in clinical psychology from Pepperdine University.

Career 
Kwan is an associate professor of psychology at Salt Lake Community College.

Public service 
Kwan was first elected in 2016, defeating the Republican candidate.

During the 2018 legislative session, Kwan served on the Higher Education Appropriations Subcommittee; the Natural Resources, Agriculture, and Environmental Quality Appropriations Subcommittee; the Political Subdivisions Committee, and the Transportation Committee.

Kwan was reelected in November 2018 with 60.03 percent of the vote, defeating the Republican candidate. In 2020, Kwan was reelected to her third consecutive term by defeating Republican challenger David Young 57% to 43%.

During the 2022 Legislative Session, Rep. Kwan served on the Executive Appropriations Committee, the Higher Education Appropriations Subcommittee, the House Education Committee, the House Transportation Committee, the Legislative Management Committee, and the Subcommittee on Oversight.

Political Positions and Significant Legislation

Tax Policy

Rep. Kwan supports having a Child Tax Credit. When speaking about President Biden's American Rescue Plan, she said the tax credit "benefitted approximately 491,000 Utah families, including more than 850,000 children, this year." In addition, she said that " the expanded Earned Income Tax Credit will serve about 138,000 Utah workers without dependent children."

Equal Rights Amendment

IN 2020, Kwan sponsored a resolution that would ratify the Equal Rights Amendment to the US Constitution. The bill did not receive any committee assignment or hearing.

Personal life 
Kwan is married and has three daughters.

References

1964 births
Asian-American people in Utah politics
Living people
Pepperdine University alumni
University of Utah alumni
Salt Lake Community College people
21st-century American politicians
21st-century American women politicians
Women state legislators in Utah
Democratic Party members of the Utah House of Representatives